Scott LaGrand (born February 11, 1970) is an American former professional ice hockey goaltender who played nine seasons in the American Hockey League (AHL), International Hockey League (IHL), and East Coast Hockey League (ECHL).

Playing career
LaGrand was drafted in the fourth round, 77th overall, by the Philadelphia Flyers in the 1988 NHL Entry Draft. He enrolled at Boston College and was named MVP of the 1990 Hockey East Tournament as a freshman. After garnering All-American honors at Boston College he signed with the Flyers shortly before the 1992-1993 season. He spent three years in the Flyers system with the Hershey Bears of the AHL before being traded in 1995 to the Tampa Bay Lightning and was subsequently assigned to their top IHL affiliate the Atlanta Knights. LaGrand signed with the Orlando Solar Bears of the IHL prior to the 1995-1996 season and spent parts of four seasons in Orlando. He also appeared in the IHL with the Chicago Wolves, Utah Grizzlies, and Fort Wayne Komets. LaGrand finished his career in the East Coast Hockey League with the Pensacola Ice Pilots where he was named team MVP after the 1999-2000 season. He dressed in two games with the Charlotte Checkers in the 2009-2010 season.

Awards and honors

References

External links

Scott LaGrand's profile at The Goaltenders Home Page

1970 births
American men's ice hockey goaltenders
Atlanta Knights players
Boston College Eagles men's ice hockey players
Charlotte Checkers (1993–2010) players
Chicago Wolves (IHL) players
Fort Wayne Komets players
Hershey Bears players
Ice hockey players from New York (state)
Living people
Orlando Solar Bears (IHL) players
Pensacola Ice Pilots players
Philadelphia Flyers draft picks
Tallahassee Tiger Sharks players
Utah Grizzlies (IHL) players
AHCA Division I men's ice hockey All-Americans